Kuwait competed at the 1988 Summer Olympics in Seoul, South Korea. 25 competitors, all men, took part in 24 events in 7 sports.

Competitors
The following is the list of number of competitors in the Games.

Athletics

Men

Track Events

Field events

Boxing

Diving

Men

Fencing

Men

Judo

Men

Rowing

Men

Swimming

Men

References

External links
Official Olympic Reports

Nations at the 1988 Summer Olympics
1988
Summer Olympics